Thomas Denman, 1st Baron Denman,  (23 July 177926 September 1854) was an English lawyer, judge and politician. He served as Lord Chief Justice between 1832 and 1850.

Background and education
Denman was born in London, the son of Dr Thomas Denman. In his fourth year, he attended Palgrave Academy in Suffolk, where his education was supervised by Anna Laetitia Barbauld and her husband. He continued to Eton and St John's College, Cambridge, where he graduated in 1800. In 1806 he was called to the bar at Lincoln's Inn, and at once entered upon practice.

Legal and judicial career

His success was rapid, and in a few years he attained a position at the bar second only to that of Henry Brougham and James Scarlett. He distinguished himself by his defence of the Luddites; but his most brilliant appearance was as one of the counsel for Queen Caroline. His speech before the House of Lords was very powerful, and some competent judges even considered it not inferior to Brougham's. It contained one or two daring passages, which made the King his bitter enemy, and retarded his legal promotion. Unfortunately he made a notable gaffe when he compared the Queen to the Biblical woman taken in adultery, who was told to "go away and sin no more". This suggested that her counsel had no belief in the Queen's innocence, and produced the mocking satire:

"Most Gracious Queen, we thee implore
To go away and sin no more
Or if that effort be too great
To go away at any rate".

At the general election of 1818 he was returned Member of Parliament for Wareham, and at once took his seat with the Whig opposition. In the following year, he was returned for Nottingham, which seat he represented until 1826 and again from 1830 until his elevation to the bench in 1832. His liberal principles had caused his exclusion from office till in 1822 he was appointed Common Serjeant of London by the corporation of London. In 1830 he was made Attorney General under Lord Grey's administration and was knighted on 24 November that year.

Two years later he was made Lord Chief Justice of the King's Bench and was sworn of the Privy Council two days later. In 1834, he was raised to the peerage as Baron Denman, of Dovedale, in the County of Derby. As a judge he is best remembered for his decision in the important privilege case of Stockdale v. Hansard (9 Ad. & El. I.; II Ad. & El. 253). In 1841 he presided, as Lord High Steward, over the trial in the House of Lords of the Earl of Cardigan for attempted murder. In O'Connell v the Queen, in 1844, he led the majority of the Lords in quashing the conviction for sedition of Daniel O'Connell. This is a tribute to his integrity since O'Connell was regarded with aversion by the British ruling class; but Denman, as he made clear, could not accept that he had received a fair trial. In 1850 he resigned from his chief justiceship and retired into private life. He was a Governor of the Charter House, and a Vice-President of the Corporation of the Sons of the Clergy. He also strove with great energy, both as a writer and as a judge, to effect the abolition of the slave trade.

Family
Lord Denman married Theodosia Anne, daughter of Reverend Richard Vevers, in 1804. His Derbyshire seat was Middleton Hall, Stoney Middleton. He died at Stoke Albany, Northamptonshire aged 75, and was succeeded in the barony by his oldest son Thomas. Another son, Joseph, was a Royal Navy officer, while another, George, was an MP and High Court judge.

Cases
Williams v. Carwardine (1833) 4 B. & Ad. 621
Stockdale v. Hansard 9 Ad. & El. I.; II Ad. & El. 253
Lynch v. Nurdin 1 QB 29, (1841) Arn and H 158, (1841) 113 ER 1041
O'Connell v The Queen [1844] 11 Cl. & Fin. 155

References

Sources
Kidd, Charles, Williamson, David (editors). Debrett's Peerage and Baronetage (1990 edition). New York: St Martin's Press, 1990.

External links

 
 

Chancellors of the Exchequer of the United Kingdom
Lord chief justices of England and Wales
Members of the Parliament of the United Kingdom for English constituencies
Lord High Stewards
Whig (British political party) MPs
Barons in the Peerage of the United Kingdom
1779 births
1854 deaths
People educated at Eton College
Alumni of St John's College, Cambridge
Attorneys General for England and Wales
Common Serjeants of London
Fellows of the Royal Society
UK MPs 1818–1820
UK MPs 1820–1826
UK MPs 1826–1830
UK MPs 1830–1831
UK MPs 1831–1832
UK MPs who were granted peerages
Members of the Privy Council of the United Kingdom
Thomas
Peers of the United Kingdom created by William IV
Knights Bachelor
Committee members of the Society for the Diffusion of Useful Knowledge